The House of Love is a striptease revue starring Jayne Mansfield. In December 1960, Dunes hotel and casino launched Mansfield's revue The House of Love (produced by Jack Cole, co-starring Hargitay). She received $35,000.00 a week as her salary ($ in  dollars), which was the highest in her career. Her wardrobe for the shows featured a gold mesh dress with sequins to cover her nipples and pubic region. That controversial sheer dress that was referred to as "Jayne Mansfield and a few sequins".

References

Citation

Erotic dance
Jayne Mansfield